Cuzcurrita de Río Tirón, known as Cuzcurrita is a village in the province and autonomous community of La Rioja, Spain.

History 

The oldest known document referring to the village dates from 1062 and is a royal bond issued by King Sancho IV of Pamplona in which several houses/crown land in Zarratón are ceded to the noble García Garcei. The place name used is Coscorrita.

In 1086, in the tale of the miracle of Santo Domingo de Silos, a person called Servando is named as being a native of Cuzcurrita.

The jurisdiction of Miranda de Ebro mentioned the existence of Quosquorrita at the end of the 11th century.

On 15 November 1367, the monarch Enrique II of Castile rewarded Juan Martínez de Rojas, by giving him Señorío de Cuzcurrita with all its territories and rights.

In the 16th century, under the reign of Philip II of Spain, Pedro Velasco, ninth Señor of Cuzcurrita, by virtue of his marriage to Marta de Rojas y Osorio, founded an entailed estate mayorazgo, carving his herald over the door of the castle as can be seen today.

This castle was built by the Suárez de Figueroa at the end of the 14th or the beginning of the 15th century. In the 19th century, after the laws abolishing lords and manors (señoríos and mayorazgos), it continued to belong for some years to the descendants of the Velasco-Rojas family. Afterwards it was successively bought and sold until 1945 when its new owners restored the property to be used as a home.

Cuzcurrita, in the Middle Ages, was a fortress; the town was walled, in addition to a castle outside the town walls.

Belonging to the district of Santo Domingo de la Calzada, it formed a part of the province of Burgos until the creation of the new province of Logroño (Royal Decreé of 30 November 1833). A year later the province was divided into nine new judicial districts and was included in that of Haro (Royal Decree of 21 April 1834).

Population 
As on 1 January 2010 the population of the town was 554 inhabitants, 292 males and 262 females.

Heritage 

 The Velasco Castle
Built at the end of the 15th century by Pedro Suárez de Figueroa, it is a walled construction with corner cubes and a graceful keep (tower) which does not have any windows in its walls.

In the 16th century, during the reign of Phillip II, D. Pedro de Velasco, IX señor of Cuzcurrita, founded the entailed estate (mayorazgo) on marrying Marta de Rojas y Osorio, carving the heraldic arms over the entrance arch in the north wall.

It has been listed as a Site of Cultural Interest in the category of Monument since 15 July 1980.

 The Roll
Located on the el Bolo hill outside the town, it was an unmistakable symbol of the town being a señorío.

 St. Michael's Church
In the main square (Plaza Mayor), it was built in the 18th century in the Rioja Baroque style, and finished in 1805.

 Hermitage: Nª Señora de Sorejana
Located 1.5 km upriver from Cuzcurrita. In the Romanic style.

 Hermitage: Nª Señora de Tironcillo
Located 3 km downriver from Cuzcurrita on the river Tirón. Built in the 18th century in the Baroque style.

References

External links 

 Ayuntamiento de Cuzcurrita de Río Tirón

Populated places in La Rioja (Spain)